Q. serrata may refer to:
 Quercus serrata, the bao li, an East Asian species of tree native to China (including Taiwan), Japan and Korea
 Quintinia serrata, an evergreen tree species

See also 
 Serrata (disambiguation)